Cyprus competed at the World Games 2017 in Wroclaw, Poland, from 20 July 2017 to 30 July 2017.

Competitors

Muaythai
Cyprus has qualified one athlete to the games.

References 

Cyprus
2017 in Cypriot sport
Cyprus at multi-sport events